Henry Blair (1807–1860) was the second African American inventor to receive a US patent.

He was born in Glen Ross, Maryland, United States in 1807. His first invention was the Seed-Planter, patented October 14, 1834, which allowed farmers to plant more corn using less labor and in a shorter time. On August 31, 1836 he obtained a second patent for a cotton planter. This invention worked by splitting the ground with two shovel-like blades which were pulled along by a horse. A wheel-driven cylinder followed behind which dropped the seed into the newly plowed ground. Blair had been a successful farmer for years and developed the inventions as a means of increasing efficiency in farming.

In the patent records, Blair is listed as a "colored man," making this identification the only one of its kind in early patent records. Blair was illiterate, therefore he signed his patents with an "x". It is said that Blair was a freedman. At the time that his patents were granted, United States patent law allowed both freed and enslaved people to obtain patents. In 1857, this law was challenged by a slave-owner who claimed that he owned "all the fruits of the slave's labor," including his slave's inventions. This resulted in a change of the law in 1858 which stated that slaves were not citizens, and therefore could not hold patents. Blair died in 1860. In 1871, six years after the American Civil War ended, the law was changed to grant all men patent rights.

References

External links
The patent text and drawings for the Seed-Planter from Today in Science.
The patent text for the Cotton-Planter from Today in Science.

19th-century American inventors
Farmers from Maryland
1860 deaths
1807 births
People from Montgomery County, Maryland
African-American inventors
African-American history of Montgomery County, Maryland
African-American farmers
19th-century American farmers